A weatherhead is a weatherproof entry point for overhead powerlines and telephone lines into a building.

Weatherhead may also refer to:

Weatherhead (surname)
Weatherhead School of Management
Weatherhead East Asian Institute at Columbia University, USA
Weatherhead High School, Merseyside, UK